The Journal of Short Film was a quarterly DVD publication of peer-reviewed short films of all genres, from 2005–2015 [Vols 1-39]. It was published by the Ohio State University Film Studies Program. The journal is modeled on the literary journal, complete with an editorial board made up of filmmakers.

Periodically, the journal hosted guest editors of note, including Sam Green, Deborah Stratman, Lucy Raven, and Karl Lind. In October 2007, the journal collaborated with WITNESS on a collection of documentaries highlighting human rights around the world. This collaboration became Volume 9. In 2009, Volume 14 was released as a collection of films produced in the Art & Tech residency program at the Wexner Center. The Library Journal called the JSF one of the "Best Magazines of 2005."

The journal was founded in 2005 by Karl Mechem, who hoped to fill a hole in film distribution and create a new venue for short film. In late 2009, publication moved to the Ohio State University and was operated by the OSU Film Studies Program.

References

External links 
 
 
 The Chicago Tribune reviews The Journal of Short Film: "Journal on DVD giving short films their due."
 "Centerpiece: The Journal of Short Film Rewrites Rules in NYC Debut"
 Creative Loafing News magazine reviews The Journal of Short Film

Film magazines published in the United States
Quarterly magazines published in the United States
Film studies journals
Magazines established in 2005
Ohio State University
Magazines published in Ohio
Magazines disestablished in 2015